Enterprise Community Partners, formerly The Enterprise Foundation, is a national nonprofit organized around three central goals: to increase housing supply, advance racial equity and build resilience and upward mobility. Founded in 1982 by developer/philanthropist James W. Rouse and his wife Patty, Enterprise has worked with community-based nonprofit organizations to develop 781,000 homes, investing $44 billion throughout the United States. The organization works in more than 800 communities and in collaboration with thousands of partners in the nonprofit, public and for-profit sectors. Affordable housing advocate and attorney Priscilla Almodovar has served as president and CEO of Enterprise since 2019.

History 
In 1972, three members of the Church of the Saviour—Terry Flood, Barbara Moore and Carolyn Banker—wanted to create low-income housing in the Adams Morgan neighborhood of D.C. With no development, financial or construction experience, they put down a non-refundable deposit to purchase the Ritz and Mozart apartment buildings. Their commitment won over James Rouse, CEO of The Rouse Company and he helped them secure $625,000 to complete the transaction and $125,000 toward the cost of rehabilitation.

In 1981, the experience inspired Jim Rouse to found Robin Hood Inc. based in one of Rouse’s American City buildings in Columbia, Maryland. The company was renamed to Jubilee Housing to help with fundraising efforts. Jubilee Housing provided the launchpad for Jim and Patty Rouse to start the Enterprise Foundation in 1982. In 2005, it was renamed Enterprise Community Partners. 

In 1984, Jim Rouse was soliciting business representing both Rouse Company as Chief executive officer and Enterprise Development as president. The Rouse Company board of directors asked Jim Rouse to leave as CEO of the Rouse Company and his position in Enterprise Development which ended his involvement with the company he founded.

Campaigns & Coalitions 
 A Call To Invest In Our Neighborhoods (ACTION)
 Enterprise Green Communities
 Health & Housing
 Design Leadership

Enterprise Green Communities 
Enterprise Green Communities is the nation's only national green building program designed explicitly for green affordable housing construction. The 2020 Green Communities Criteria is the latest version of the guidelines, first introduced in 2005. Updates include a Path to Zero Energy, new water-quality standards, and a new approach to affordable housing in rural areas, tribal communities and small towns.

Projects 
 National Community Stabilization Trust - A 2008 initiative to purchase and resell high-risk foreclosed properties.
 Remington, Baltimore
 Gray's Landing- Portland
 High Place West- Santa Monica
 Myers Place- Chicago
 Hurricane Sandy Recovery- New York
 Sandtown- Baltimore
 Tempozan Marketplace a Festival marketplace project near Osaka, Japan developed as a public-private partnership with the Osaka Waterfront Development Corporation.

See also 
 Green building
 NeighborWorks America
 Low-Income Housing Tax Credit
 New Markets Tax Credits

References

External links 
 Enterprise Community Partners Website
 Enterprise YouTube channel

Community-building organizations
Companies based in Columbia, Maryland
Non-profit organizations based in Maryland
Sustainable building in the United States
Rouse family